Hawthorn High School is an English-medium comprehensive school in the village of Hawthorn near Pontypridd, in the county borough of Rhondda Cynon Taf, Wales. It was filmed by the CBBC documentary series Our School in 2018 and appeared in Series 5 of the Television Show.

References 

Secondary schools in Rhondda Cynon Taf